The Edirnekapı Martyr's Cemetery, one of the largest burial grounds of Istanbul, Turkey, is located in the neighborhood of Edirnekapı of Eyüp district, in the European part of the city. It consists of an old, historical part and a modern one. War graves of fallen Ottoman soldiers during the Balkan Wars, the Gallipoli campaign of World War I, graves of the Turkish Armed Forces military personnel and law enforcement officials, firefighters, Turkish Airlines personnel are part of the cemetery.

History 
The cemetery is said originally to have been formed with the graves of the Ottoman soldiers, who fell in the battle during the Second Ottoman Siege and Fall of Constantinople in 1453, where the last Byzantine emperor Constantine XI established his command and the Ottoman sultan Mehmed II made his triumphal entry into the conquered city. There is however no historical or archaeological evidence for this, the oldest known graves date from ca. 1600 AD. The cemetery is situated outside Edirnekapı (literally: Edirne Gate), historically the Gate of Charisius of the city walls, on top of the sixth hill of the old city.

The old part of the cemetery, including an area called "Mısır Tarlası" (literally: Corn Field), hosts graves of personalities from the 16th to the early 20th centuries. The other part of the cemetery consists of two grounds, Edirnekapı Cemetery and Sakızağacı Cemetery. Soldiers, who fought and were wounded in the Russo-Turkish Wars, Balkan Wars and the World War I, and died in Istanbul after hospitalization, were interred in Edirnekapı Cemetery. The General Command of Mapping denotes the number of such historical graves with around 13,000.

Military personnel of the Turkish Army, Navy and Air Force, personnel of the police force, firefighters and Turkish Airlines have all separate sections in the cemetery.

Notable burials 
Listed alphabetically:

In the historic part
 Bâkî (died 1600), poet
 Buhurizade Itri (died 1711), composer

In the modern part
 Yunus Nadi Abalıoğlu (1878–1945), journalist
 Yusuf Akçura (1876–1935), Pan-Turkist activist
 Oğuz Atay (1934–1977), author
 Mehmet Akif Ersoy (1873–1936), poet
 Burhan Kuzu (1955–2020), academic and politician
 Süleyman Nazif (1870–1927), poet
 Recep Peker (1889–1950), prime minister
 Ruhi Sarıalp (1924–2001), Olympic medalist track and field athlete
 Leyla Saz (1850–1936), female composer
 Naim Süleymanoğlu (1967–2017), multiple world and Olympic champion weightlifter
 Bruno Taut (1880–1938), German architect (the only non-Muslim)
 Vedat Tek (1873–1942), architect
 Ahmed Tevfik Pasha (1845–1936), last Grand Vizier of the Ottoman Empire
 Cengiz Topel (1934–1964), fighter pilot
 Suat Hayri Ürgüplü (1903–1981), prime minister

Gallery

References

External links

 Hans-Peter Laqueur, Osmanische Friedhöfe und Grabsteine in Istanbul (=Istanbuler Mitteilungen, Beiheft 38) Tübingen (Ernst Wasmuth Verlag) 1993, pp. 19–25

Cemeteries in Istanbul
Turkish military memorials and cemeteries
Eyüp
Sunni cemeteries